Simin may refer to:

 Simin (name)
 Simin, Iran
 Simin (film), a 2018 Iranian film
 Simin-e Abaru, Iran
 Simin-e Zagheh, Iran
 Karl Simin
 Rhyu Si-min
 Xu Simin